George Edwin Haas (born May 26, 1935) is a former outfielder, coach, manager and scout in American Major League Baseball. 

Haas spent 14 years as a skipper in the farm system of the Atlanta Braves and replaced Joe Torre as Atlanta's manager after the 1984 season. His 1985 Braves squad went 50–71 (.413). With the Braves in fifth place in the National League West Division and 22 games out of the lead, Haas was fired on August 26, 1985, and succeeded by interim pilot Bobby Wine.

He graduated from St. John High School in Paducah and signed his first professional contract with the Chicago Cubs. He made the Majors with the Cubs in 1957 and was traded to the Milwaukee Braves in the offseason. His MLB career consisted of 55 games (1957–1958; 1960) with those two clubs, batting .243 with one home run and 17 total hits. A broken ankle cost him the entire 1959 season.

Haas remained with the Braves after his minor league playing career ended, managing and coaching in the minor leagues (1965–73; 1978–84), and serving as a Major League coach (1974–77). After his brief MLB managerial career, he served as a special assignment scout for the Montreal Expos (1986–94) and Boston Red Sox (1995–2003).

He comes from a baseball family: his brother, Louis, was an infielder in the Braves' organization from 1959 to 1962; two sons, Matt and Danny, are former minor league players who currently scout for the Baltimore Orioles; cousins Phil and Gene Roof are former Major League players and coaches and longtime minor league managers; and another cousin, Paul Roof, pitched in the minor leagues.

References

External links

1935 births
Living people
Atlanta Braves coaches
Atlanta Braves managers
Baseball players from Kentucky
Boston Red Sox scouts
Chicago Cubs players
Denver Bears players
Des Moines Bruins players
Fort Worth Cats players
Gainesville Owls players
Hawaii Islanders players
Los Angeles Angels (minor league) players
Louisville Colonels (minor league) players
Major League Baseball outfielders
Milwaukee Braves players
Minor league baseball managers
Montreal Expos scouts
Sportspeople from Paducah, Kentucky
Vancouver Mounties players
Wichita Braves players